Das Mädchen auf der Treppe (1982) is a soundtrack single by the German band Tangerine Dream for an  of the TV series Tatort.

The title track is a remix of "White Eagle". Tracks 1 and 3 were released on the 7" single version and all tracks were released on the 12" single. The 12" single mistakenly shows 33 RPM on the vinyl label, thus some bootlegs included these tracks at the wrong speed. Some of the tracks have been re-released in a re-mixed format, but the originals are only available on vinyl.

Track listing

Personnel
 Edgar Froese
 Christopher Franke
 Johannes Schmoelling

References

1982 soundtrack albums
Television soundtracks
Tangerine Dream soundtracks
Virgin Records soundtracks